Robert George Allietta (born May 1, 1952) is an American former Major League Baseball catcher who played for the California Angels in 1975.

Amateur career
A native of New Bedford, Massachusetts, Allietta graduated from Lawrence High School in Falmouth, Massachusetts, and was selected by the St. Louis Cardinals in the 8th round of the June 1970 MLB Draft. He opted to play college baseball for the University of Massachusetts Lowell, and in 1970, Allietta played collegiate summer baseball for the Falmouth Commodores of the Cape Cod Baseball League (CCBL). Allietta was selected by the California Angels in the first round (seventh pick) of the 1971 MLB Draft (secondary phase).

Professional career
He made his major league debut for the Angels on May 6, 1975, at the Oakland–Alameda County Coliseum. Allietta was the starting catcher that night against the Oakland Athletics, and went 0-for-2 against Ken Holtzman. In the top of the 7th, Rollie Fingers was called in to face Allietta, and Bill Sudakis pinch hit for him.

Allietta was on the disabled list that from July 6 to August 17 of 1975, limiting his playing time to 21 games in his only big-league season. Season and career totals include a .178 batting average (8-for-45), one home run, two runs batted in, and four runs scored. He was excellent on defense, handling 98 chances without an error, and had just one passed ball in 122 innings caught. He also threw out four of 16 baserunners attempting to steal.

Coaching career
Allietta returned to the CCBL as Falmouth's field manager for the 1983 season.

References

External links

Retrosheet

1952 births
Living people
Major League Baseball catchers
Baseball players from Massachusetts
California Angels players
Cape Cod Baseball League coaches
Tacoma Tigers players
Salt Lake City Angels players
Tacoma Tugs players
Toledo Mud Hens players
Portland Beavers players
Salt Lake City Gulls players
Memphis Blues players
Rochester Red Wings players
Stockton Ports players
Idaho Falls Angels players
El Paso Sun Kings players
Shreveport Braves players
Quad Cities Angels players
Shreveport Captains players
Falmouth Commodores players